Laceyville is a borough in Wyoming County, Pennsylvania, United States. The population was 363 at the 2020 census.

Geography
Laceyville is located at  (41.645337, -76.160451).

Demographics

At the 2000 census, there were 379 people, 160 households and 102 families residing in the borough. The population density was 1,895 per square mile (731.7/km2). There were 185 housing units at an average density of 925 per square mile (361.3/km2). The racial makeup of the borough was 94.5% White, 0.5% African American, 4.7% some other race, and 0.3% from two or more races. Hispanic or Latino of any race were 7.9% of the population.

There were 160 households, of which 32.5% had children under the age of 18 living with them, 44.4% were married couples living together, 13.1% had a female householder with no husband present, and 36.3% were non-families. 32.5% of all households were made up of individuals, and 12.5% had someone living alone who was 65 years of age or older. The average household size was 2.37 and the average family size was 2.89.

23.7% of the population were under the age of 18, 61.8% from 18 to 64, and 14.5% who were 65 years of age or older. The median age was 39.4 years.

The median household income was $46,667 and the median family income was $58,542. Males had a median income of $32,125 and females $25,000. The per capita income was $18,594. About 14.4% of families and 15.1% of the population were below the poverty line, including 22.6% of those under age 18 and 18.2% of those age 65 or over.

References

External links

Populated places established in 1766
Boroughs in Wyoming County, Pennsylvania